Te Kaeaea  (?–1871) was a notable New Zealand tribal leader. Of Māori descent, he identified with the Ngāti Tama iwi.

References

1871 deaths
Ngāti Tama people
Signatories of the Treaty of Waitangi
Year of birth missing